The Metropolitan Cathedral of Our Lady of the Assumption, also known as St Mary's Metropolitan Cathedral, is a Roman Catholic church in Edinburgh, Scotland. It is the seat of the Archbishop of Saint Andrews and Edinburgh and the mother church of Scots Catholicism. The cathedral church is located at the East End of New Town in the city centre.

History
The Chapel of St Mary's was opened in 1814, and was originally designed by James Gillespie Graham. It was built in replacement of the Chapel of St Andrew the Apostle on Blackfriars Wynd (which had been tolerated despite Scotland not recognising the Catholic faith). The building of a purpose-built church recognises a broad acceptance of the faith by 1814.

The church was considerably embellished over the years, and in 1878 on the restoration of the Scottish hierarchy it became the pro-cathedral of the new Archdiocese of St Andrews and Edinburgh. It was renamed the Metropolitan Cathedral on 5 July 1886 with all the rights and privileges appertaining to such a church. It contains the National Shrine of St. Andrew.

Pope John Paul II visited St Mary's in May 1982 as part of his pastoral visit to Scotland.

Architecture
The cathedral was designed in 1813–1814 in the neo-perpendicular style by James Gillespie Graham, with additional designs by Augustus Pugin.

In 1892 a fire at the neighbouring Theatre Royal required changes to the cathedral. Arches were made in the side walls and aisles were added on both sides, designed by John Biggar. The sanctuary was extended backwards by three bays of arches.

The war memorial and high altar were added in 1921, designed by Reginald Fairlie. A baldachino was added in 1927. In 1932 the height of the roof was increased by Reid and Forbes.

In the 1970s the front of the cathedral was opened up due to the demolition of tenement buildings. The porch and baptistery were replaced by a larger porch, designed by T. Harley Haddow, and the sanctuary was remodelled to meet the requirements of the Second Vatican Council.

Music
The Schola Cantorum has eight singers and sings a wide range of sacred music including plainchant, renaissance polyphony and modern compositions. In addition, there is a mixed-ability cathedral choir.

A new organ was installed in 2008, built by Matthey Copley and having 4,000 pipes.

The Director of Music is Michael Ferguson, who also teaches at the University of St Andrews and is a composer. The organist is Simon Leach.

Concerts and recitals were held in the cathedral during the Edinburgh Festival Fringe from 2009 to 2016.

Current clergy
Mgr Patrick Burke, VG (administrator);  Fr Robert Taylor
 Fr Tadeusz Puton SAC (non-resident), Chaplain of the Polish Mission

Parish organisation
From 2017 the many parishes in Edinburgh have been organised into clusters to better coordinate their resources.  St Mary's Cathedral is one of four parishes in Cluster 1 along with Ss Ninian and Triduana, St Patrick and St Albert.

Cafe Camino
The cathedral formerly operated a cafe in an adjoining building. It was used as a venue as part of the Free Fringe at the Edinburgh Festival Fringe.

See also
 List of cathedrals in the United Kingdom
 St Mary's Cathedral, Edinburgh (Episcopal)

References

External links
 
 St Mary's Cathedral former organist's website
  Sacred Scotland
Cafe Camino 
 Royal Commission on the Ancient and Historical Monuments of Scotland (RCAHMS)
 The Scottish Catholic Archives
  Scottish Catholic Historical Association

Listed churches in Edinburgh
Roman Catholic cathedrals in Scotland
Roman Catholic national shrines
Roman Catholic churches in Edinburgh
Category B listed buildings in Edinburgh
Listed cathedrals in Scotland
James Gillespie Graham buildings
Roman Catholic churches completed in 1814
19th-century Roman Catholic church buildings in the United Kingdom
Roman Catholic shrines in the United Kingdom
Religious organizations established in 1814